Jay Dratler (September 14, 1910 – September 25, 1968) was an American screenwriter and novelist.

Biography
Born in New York City to a mother originally from Austria, he attended the University of North Carolina at Chapel Hill in the late 1920s, then studied at the Sorbonne in France and the University of Vienna, achieving fluency in French and German.

After his return to the United States in 1932, he worked as an editor for a New York publisher and translated the books Goya and Zeppelin from German to English. He then moved to Hollywood, becoming a successful novelist and rising to prominence as a screenwriter during the classic era of film noir in the 1940s. He wrote six novels, many screenplays and more than twenty television scripts. He won an Edgar Allan Poe Award for Call Northside 777, and was an Oscar nominee for the 1944 film noir, Laura. The 1948 film noir, Pitfall, was based on Dratler's novel of the same title.

Later in life, Dratler became conversant in Spanish, moving to Mexico in the 1960s. Dratler died of a heart attack in 1968 at the British-American Hospital in Mexico City. His body was returned to New York. He was survived by his widow, Berenice, and their two children, a daughter and son.  The latter, Jay Dratler Jr., became a professor at the University of Akron School of Law, specializing in intellectual property law.

Works

Novels
 Manhattan Side Street (1936) Longmans, Green and Co., New York
 Ducks in Thunder (1940) Reynal & Hitchcock, New York (later re-titled All for a Woman)
 The Pitfall (1947) Thomas Y. Crowell Co., New York
 The Judas Kiss (1955) Henry Holt and Co., New York
 Doctor Paradise (1957) Popular Library, New York
 Without Mercy (1957) Robert Hale, London
 Dream of a Woman (1958) Popular Library, New York

Translations
 Goya. A portrait of the artist as a man (1936) Knight Publications, New YorkTranslated by Clement Greenberg, Emma Ashton and Jay Dratler,from the German by Manfred Schneider (1935) Don Francisco de Goya
 Zeppelin, the story of lighter-than-air craft (1937) Longmans & Co., LondonTranslated by Jay Dratler from the German by Ernst A Lehmann and Leonhard Adelt (1936)Auf Luftpatrouille und Weltfahrt - Erlebnisse eines Zeppelinführers in Krieg und Frieden - Zeppelin,Schmidt & Günther, Kelkheim, Germany

Screenplays
Dratler's films as screenwriter, often with collaborators, include:

 La Conga Nights (1940) Universal
 Girls Under 21 (1940) Columbia
 Confessions of Boston Blackie (1941)
 Meet Boston Blackie (1941) Columbia
 The Wife Takes a Flyer (1942)
 Fly-by-Night (1942)
 Get Hep to Love (1942)
 Laura (1944)
 Higher and Higher (1944)
 It's in the Bag! (1945)
 The Dark Corner (1946)
 Call Northside 777 (1948)
 That Wonderful Urge (1948)
 Dancing in the Dark (1949)
 Impact (1949)
 The Las Vegas Story (1952)
 We're Not Married! (1952)
 I Aim at the Stars (1960)

Plays
 A Grape for Seeing (1965)
 The Women of Troy (1966)

References

External links
 
NY Times Biography

American male screenwriters
Writers from New York City
Edgar Award winners
1910 births
1968 deaths
University of North Carolina at Chapel Hill alumni
Screenwriters from New York (state)
20th-century American male writers
20th-century American screenwriters